Maarg is an Indian Hindi film directed by Mahesh Bhatt, released in 1992. The film stars Vinod Khanna, Hema Malini, and Dimple Kapadia in lead roles. Critic Iqbal Masood of The Indian Express praised the film as "a powerful satire" and "a moving film with excellent performances."

Theme 
Maarg deals with power politics within an ashram, and was scripted by Suraj Sanim, himself an ex-ashramite. The film presents a romantic story between a religious Aarti (Hema Malini) and a reformed criminal looking for redemption, Suraj (Vinod Khanna). Director Bhatt said, "The subject of spirituality has tormented me for a long time."

Cast 
 Vinod Khanna as Suraj Singh  
 Hema Malini as Aarti Devi  
 Dimple Kapadia as Uma  
 Anupam Kher as Guru  
 Paresh Rawal as Bodhraj

Music
Anand Bakshi wrote all lyrics. 

"Bas Chain Aa Gaya Hai" - Mohammed Aziz 
"Kaash Main Ek Panchhi Hota" - Mohammed Aziz
"Jeevan Ko Sangeet Bana Lo" - Lata Mangeshkar 
"Mere Mehboob Aa" - Asha Bhosle 
"Tune Toh Jag Chhod Diya" - Kavita Krishnamurthy

References

External links

1992 films
1990s Hindi-language films
Films scored by Anu Malik